Georges Gruillot (14 August 1931 – 7 March 2021) was a French politician.

Biography
He was a member of the Rally for the Republic and subsequently the Union for a Popular Movement. He retired in 2008 and became a Knight of the Legion of Honour on 1 January 2009.

Georges Gruillot died on 7 March 2021 at the age of 89.

References

1931 births
2021 deaths
Rally for the Republic politicians
Union for a Popular Movement politicians
Mayors of places in Bourgogne-Franche-Comté
Departmental councillors (France)
French Senators of the Fifth Republic
Senators of Doubs
Chevaliers of the Légion d'honneur